Remembrances & Forecasts is an album by the progressive bluegrass band Country Gentlemen, released in 1974.

Track listing

 Willow Creek Dam
 Remembrance of You
 Irish Spring
 Billy McGhee
 Home in Louisiana
 King of Spades
 Little Grave
 Delta Queen
 Heartaches
 Welcome to New York
 Lord Protect My Soul
 Circuit Rider

Personnel
Left to right

 Jerry Douglas - Dobro
 Ricky Skaggs - Fiddle, vocals
 James Bailey - Banjo
 Charlie Waller - Guitar, Vocals
 Bill Yates - Bass, Vocals
 Doyle Lawson - Mandolin, Vocals

References

External links
 https://web.archive.org/web/20091215090142/http://www.lpdiscography.com/c/Cgentlemen/cgent.htm

1974 albums
Vanguard Records albums
The Country Gentlemen albums